Herbert Salzman (May 2, 1916 – December 23, 1990) was an American businessman who served as the United States Ambassador to the Organisation for Economic Co-operation and Development from 1977 to 1981.

He died of leukemia on December 23, 1990, in Manhattan, New York City, New York at age 74.

References

1916 births
1990 deaths
Ambassadors of the United States to the Organisation for Economic Co-operation and Development
New York (state) Democrats